Min Gwan-gi (Min Kwan-ki, born 26 June 1942) is a South Korean equestrian. He competed in the individual jumping event at the 1960 Summer Olympics.

References

External links
 

1942 births
Living people
South Korean male equestrians
Olympic equestrians of South Korea
Equestrians at the 1960 Summer Olympics
Sportspeople from Seoul